Por que Não? (en: Why Not?) is the fourth studio album by Brazilian pop singer Kelly Key, released on September 20, 2006, by Warner Music.

Track listing

References

2006 albums
Kelly Key albums